Henry William Wilberforce (22 September 1807 – 23 April 1873), was a Church of England clergyman, a  Tractarian, a convert to the Roman Catholic Church, and thereafter a newspaper proprietor, editor and journalist.

Life 
Henry Wilberforce was born in 1807, the youngest son of William Wilberforce and his wife, Barbara Ann Spooner.  He studied classics and mathematics at Oriel College, Oxford, where he was elected president of the Oxford Union. He graduated BA in 1830, MA in 1833, in the meantime enrolling as a student at Lincoln's Inn. During his time in Oxford he had received tuition from John Henry Newman, through whose influence he not only became attached to the Tractarian movement, but abandoned his plan to study for the bar, and instead took orders as an Anglican clergyman.

Wilberforce served the Anglican church from 1834 (also the year of his marriage) until 1850, first as curate of Bransgrove (Bransgore), Hampshire (1834), then as vicar of Walmer (1841), and finally as vicar of East Farleigh, Kent (1843). In 1850 he followed his wife, Mary Sargent, daughter of John Sargent, into the Catholic Church.

Upon his conversion, he wrote Reasons for Submitting to the Catholic Church: a Farewell Letter to his Parishioners (1851). The Catholic Defence Association was founded in Ireland the same year, and in 1852 Wilberforce became Secretary, living in Ireland for two or three years. As Secretary of the Catholic Defence Association he engaged in a correspondence on Church of Ireland proselytizing which was published as Proselytism in Ireland: the Catholic Defence Association versus the Irish Church Missions on the charge of bribery and intimidation; a correspondence between the Rev. Alex Dallas and the Rev. Henry Wilberforce (1852). In 1854 he became owner and editor of the Catholic Standard, changing the name to the Weekly Register the following year. In 1864, finding the pace of weekly editorial responsibility too demanding, he sold the Weekly Register and embarked on a more leisurely production of articles and reviews for the Dublin Review. After his death a selection of these was published as The Church and the Empires (1874), with a biographical preface by Cardinal Newman. He died in Stroud, Gloucestershire, on 23 April 1873.

One of his sons was a member of the Dominican community at Woodchester Priory near Stroud.

Publications 
The Foundation of the Faith Assailed in Oxford: a letter to His Grace the Archbishop of Canterbury, &c. &c. &c. Visitor to the University, with particular reference to the changes in its constitution, now under consideration. By a clerical member of Convocation [i.e. H.W. Wilberforce]. London: Printed for J.G. & F. Rivington, 1835.
The Parochial System: An Appeal to English Churchmen. London: Printed for J. G. & F. Rivington, St. Paul's Church Yard, and Waterloo Place, Pall Mall, 1838.
The Building of the House of God: a sermon preached in the Church of All Saints, Southampton [...]August 13, 1839 at the rebuilding of the ancient church of St. Lawrence. Southampton: Smart, 1839.
Christian Unity. Tracts on the Church 7. London: James Burns, 1842.
On the Danger of State Interference with the Trust Deeds of Church Schools. A Letter to Sir R. H. Inglis. London, 1847.
Reasons for Submitting to the Catholic Church: a Farewell Letter to his Parishioners. London: Burns and Lambert, 1851.
The Church and the Empires: historical periods. Preceded by a memoir of the author by J.H. Newman. London: Henry S. King & Co., 1874.

References

External links 
 John Henry Newman's memoir, written as an introduction to Wilberforce's The Church and the Empires

1807 births
1873 deaths
Alumni of Oriel College, Oxford
Presidents of the Oxford Union
English Anglo-Catholics
19th-century English Anglican priests
English Roman Catholics
English religious writers
Anglican priest converts to Roman Catholicism
English male journalists
19th-century British journalists
English male non-fiction writers
Henry
19th-century English male writers
Tractarians
Anglo-Catholic clergy
Anglo-Catholic writers
People from East Farleigh